Hugendubel is, along with Thalia, one of two major book retailers in Germany. It was founded in 1893 by Heinrich Karl Gustav Hugendubel in Munich.

History 

Heinrich Karl Gustav Hugendubel bought an already existing bookshop at the Salvatorplatz in Munich in 1893, thereby laying the foundation for a German limited partnership, GmbH & Co. KG.  The firm was left to his son, Heinrich Hugendubel, in 1916 and then his son, Paul Hugendubel, in 1934. After Paul's death in 1943, his wife, Anneliese Hugendubel, assumed control, acting as managing chief until 1964 when their son, Heinrich Hugendubel, opened the first branch in Munich. Heinrich Hugendubel II, led the enterprise till his death in 2005 and incorporated acting partners Ekkehard Lux, Thomas Nitz, Torsten Brunn, Nina Hugendubel and Maximilian Hugendubel.

In January 2011, the company hit the headlines because it was accused of censorship in the company's own trade union blog. Due to the cooperation with the Weltbild publishing house of the Catholic Church, a "filter" was briefly applied in Hugendubel's online shop, which filtered out numerous gay and lesbian, church-critical, esoteric and communist articles. After unanimous critical media response, the filter was removed and corresponding titles were listed again.

References 

Bookstores of Germany